Tetramethyl orthosilicate (TMOS) is the chemical compound with the formula Si(OCH3)4.  This molecule consists of four methoxy groups bonded to a silicon atom.  The basic properties are similar to the more popular tetraethyl orthosilicate, which is usually preferred because the product of hydrolysis, ethanol, is less toxic than methanol.

Tetramethyl orthosilicate hydrolyzes to SiO2:
Si(OCH3)4  +  2 H2O  →  SiO2  +  4 CH3OH

In organic synthesis, Si(OCH3)4 has been used to convert ketones and aldehydes to the corresponding ketals and acetals, respectively.

Safety
The hydrolysis of Si(OCH3)4 produces insoluble SiO2 and CH3OH (methanol). Even at low concentrations inhalation causes lung lesions, and at slightly higher concentrations eye contact with the vapor causes blindness. Worse, at low concentrations (200 ppm/15 min) the damage is often insidious, with onset of symptoms hours after exposure.   The mode of action is the precipitation of silica in the eyes and/or lungs. Contrary to common information, including several erroneous MSDS sheets, the methanol produced is only a risk through chronic exposure and is a comparatively small concern. The mechanisms of methanol toxicity are well established, methanol causes blindness via conversion to formaldehyde, then to toxic formic acid in the liver; methanol splashes to the eye cause only moderate and reversible eye irritation.

References

External links 
 WebBook page for SiC4H12O4
 CDC - NIOSH Pocket Guide to Chemical Hazards

Methyl esters
Silicate esters